Nerodia clarkii clarkii, the Gulf salt marsh snake, is a subspecies of N. clarkii that is indigenous to the south-eastern United States.  It is a nonvenomous, colubrid snake that inhabits coastal salt marshes and brackish estuaries along the coast of the Gulf of Mexico from Florida to Texas.

Description
The Gulf salt marsh snake is a moderately stout aquatic snake. The color pattern in this subspecies is variable, but adults tend to have a dorsum that ranges from dark gray to reddish-brown with four yellowish longitudinal stripes down the body, two on each side. The belly is dark gray to reddish-brown with one to three rows of pale spots.

Reproduction
The Gulf salt marsh snake reaches sexual maturity at three years. Their typical lifespan is up to 20 years.

Diet
N. c. clarkii is primarily nocturnal, preying upon small fish, crabs, shrimp, and other invertebrates that become trapped in tidal pools during low tide.

References

Further reading
Baird SF, Girard CF (1853). Catalogue of North American Reptiles in the Museum of the Smithsonian Institution. Part I.—Serpents. Washington, District of Columbia: Smithsonian Institution. xvi + 172 pp. (Regina clarkii, new species, p. 48).
Powell R, Conant R, Collins JT (2016). Peterson Field Guide to Reptiles and Amphibians of Eastern and Central North America, Fourth Edition. Boston and New York: Houghton Mifflin Harcourt. xiv + 494 pp., 47 Plates, 207 Figures. . (Nerodia c. clarkii, p. 415 + Plate 40).

clarkii clarkii
Reptiles of the United States